The 1970–71 NBA season was the Rockets' 4th season in the NBA.  It was also the team's final season in San Diego, as the franchise relocated to Houston, Texas following the season.

Offseason

Draft picks

Roster

Regular season

Season standings

Record vs. opponents

Game log

Awards and records
Calvin Murphy, NBA All-Rookie Team 1st Team

References

San Diego
Houston Rockets seasons